The men's singles tennis event at the 2019 Summer Universiade was held from 5 to 13 July at the Circolo Tennis and Lungomare in Naples, Italy.

Chinese Taipei's Tseng Chun-hsin won the gold medal, defeating Uzbekistan's Khumoyun Sultanov in the final, 6–7(4–7), 6–3, 6–1.

France's Lucas Poullain and Russia's Ivan Gakhov won the bronze medals.

Seeds
All seeds receive a bye into the second round.

Draw

Finals

Top half

Section 1

Section 2

Section 3

Section 4

Bottom half

Section 5

Section 6

Section 7

Section 8

References
Main Draw

Men's singles